A topi is an antelope species of the genus Damaliscus. The word is used for the species D. lunatus in general, but has also been restricted to D. lunatus jimela. The subspecies D. lunatus topi is also called topi.

Topi may also refer to:

Headwear
Dhaka topi or Nepali topi, a style of hat that is part of the Nepali national dress
Bhaad-gaaule, part of Newari traditional dress, and an alternative to the Dhaka topi
Taqiyah (cap), a short, rounded cap worn by Muslim men, called "topi" in the Indian subcontinent
Gandhi cap or Gandhi topi, a white topi worn in India and having political significance
Pith helmet or topi, a lightweight helmet made of cork or pith with a cloth cover
Sindhi topi, a style of hat worn in Sindh
Birke topi, a traditional cap worn in the western hilly region of Nepal
Himachali cap or Pahari topi, a hat worn in Himachal Pradesh
Topi, the word used in the Indian subcontinent for a Kufi, a short, rounded cap
Rumi topi, the word used in the Indian subcontinent for a Fez, a flat, felt cap

People
Bamir Topi (born 1957), former President of the Republic of Albania
Teuta Topi (born 1962), former first lady of Albania
Topi Helin (born 1978), Finnish professional Thai boxer
Topi Mattila (born 1946), Finnish ski jumper
Topi Niemelä (born 2002), Finnish ice hockey defenceman
Topi Sarparanta (born 1975), Finnish Nordic combined skier

Other uses
Topi, Khyber Pakhtunkhwa, Swabi District, Khyber Pakhtunkhwa, Pakistan
Topi Drama, a Pakistani rock band
 Topi Tehsil, Swabi, Khyber Pakhtunkhwa, Pakistan